In paleontology, a zombie taxon  (plural zombie taxa) or the zombie effect refers to a fossil that was washed out of sediments and re-deposited in rocks and/or sediments millions of years younger. That basic mistake in the interpretation of the age of the fossil leads to its title, in that the discovered fossil was at some point mobile (or "walking") despite the original organism having been long dead. When that occurs, the fossil is described as a "reworked fossil" or remanié.

See also
 Convergent evolution
 Dead clade walking
 Extinction
 Elvis taxon
 Lazarus taxon
 Living fossil

Further reading
Archibald, J. David. (1996). Dinosaur Extinction and the End of An Era. Columbia University Press, 672-684. , who defined the terms zombie effect and zombie taxon/taxa.
 Weishampel, David B. et al. (2004). The Dinosauria. University of California Press. .
Abigail Lane et al. "Estimating paleodiversities: a test of the taxic and phylogenetic methods".

References

Extinction
Phylogenetics